Hassan Junction railway station, also known as Hassana Junction railway station (station code: HAS). It is the main railway station in Hassan district, Karnataka. It serves Hassan city. The station consists of three platforms.

Connectivity 
Many trains travel through this station on a daily basis. This junction connects  Hassan to major cities like Bengaluru, Mysuru, Mangalore, Hubli-Dharwad, Shivamogga, Solapur, Karwar, Kannur, Mumbai, and  Delhi.

References 

Mysore railway division
 Railway junction stations in Karnataka
Railway stations in Hassan district